Kim Eagles (born 15 December 1976) is a Canadian sport shooter. Eagles won a gold medal at the 1999 Pan American Games in the 10 metre air pistol event. She also participated in the 2000 Summer Olympics in the 10 metre air pistol event.

She first competed at the Commonwealth Games in 1998, winning a bronze medal in the 25 metre sport pistol event. She went on to win a gold medal at the 2002 Commonwealth Games in the 10 metre air pistol pairs event with Dorothy Ludwig and three bronze medals at the 2006 Commonwealth Games in the 25 metre sport pistol, 25 metre sport pistol pairs with Avianna Chao and the 10 metre air pistol events.

References

1976 births
Living people
Canadian female sport shooters
Sportspeople from Montreal
Shooters at the 1998 Commonwealth Games
Shooters at the 2002 Commonwealth Games
Shooters at the 2006 Commonwealth Games
Commonwealth Games gold medallists for Canada
Commonwealth Games bronze medallists for Canada
Commonwealth Games medallists in shooting
Pan American Games medalists in shooting
Pan American Games bronze medalists for Canada
Shooters at the 1999 Pan American Games
Olympic shooters of Canada
Shooters at the 2000 Summer Olympics
Medalists at the 1999 Pan American Games
21st-century Canadian women
20th-century Canadian women
Medallists at the 1998 Commonwealth Games
Medallists at the 2002 Commonwealth Games
Medallists at the 2006 Commonwealth Games